Chapo Trap House is an American politics and humor podcast hosted by Will Menaker, Matt Christman, Felix Biederman, and Amber A'Lee Frost, and is produced by Chris Wade. The podcast became known for its irreverent leftist commentary in the run-up to the 2016 US presidential election.

The first episode of Chapo Trap House was released on March 13, 2016. , 809 episodes have been released. The podcast is updated several times weekly.

Episodes

2016

2017

2018

2019

2020

2021

2022

2023

Repeat guests 
Virgil Texas and Brendan James made multiple appearances before becoming cohosts, and Amber A'Lee Frost also made a guest appearance before becoming a cohost. After retiring as a cohost and producer, Brendan James occasionally continues to appear as a guest. This list only counts appearances by cohosts before or after they were a cohost.

Notes

References

External links 
 Free episodes
 Chapo Trap House on SoundCloud
 Chapo Trap House on iTunes

 Premium episodes
 Chapo Trap House on Patreon

Chapo Trap House